Janów-Nikiszowiec is a district of Katowice. It has an area of 8.65 km2 and in 2007 had 11,496 inhabitants.

The district encompasses the former Janów and Nikiszowiec.

References

Districts of Katowice